Night Sky Network is an educational effort sponsored by NASA to help educate the public through astronomy clubs across the United States.

See also
 List of astronomical societies

References

External links
 http://nightsky.jpl.nasa.gov/

Amateur astronomy organizations